was a Japanese film actor best known for his roles in the Godzilla film series.

Life and career
Akira Takarada was born in Korea under Japanese rule, and lived for a time in Manchuria, China. His father worked as an engineer on the South Manchuria Railway. After the war, he remained in Harbin, and he was able to speak Mandarin Chinese and English.

Takarada moved to Allied-occupied Japan with his family in 1948. He joined Toho as part of their "New Face" program in April 1953. In his film debut, he had a small role in And Then the Liberty Bell Rang, a biography of the educator Fukuzawa Yukichi. His big break came when he was cast as navy diver Hideto Ogata in the original Godzilla (1954). He became a popular actor at Toho for his good looks and charismatic, sophisticated character. He continued his association with the Godzilla series in Mothra vs. Godzilla (1964), Invasion of Astro-Monster (1965), and Godzilla vs. the Sea Monster (1966). He returned to the series in 1992 with Godzilla vs. Mothra and appeared again in Godzilla: Final Wars (2004). Other Toho science-fiction/special-effects films in which he appeared include Half Human (1955), The Last War (1961), King Kong Escapes (1967), and Latitude Zero (1969).

Toho prepared a musical production of Gone with the Wind with Broadway composer-lyricist Harold Rome for its new Imperial Garden theatre in 1970. Entitled Scarlett, Takarada was originally scheduled to play the role of Rhett Butler. However, injuries sustained in an accident in which he fell off a bulldozer while filming prevented him from participating in this stage production.

Takarada made a guest appearance at the fan convention G-Fest XVII in 2010, and again at G-Fest XIX in July 2012,  G-Fest XXIII in July 2016, and  G-Fest XXVI in 2019. He received G-FEST's Mangled Skyscraper Award in 2010, and the G-FAN Lifetime Achievement Award in 2019. He has come to be known as "The Godfather of G-FEST." On March 27, 2013, Takarada posed for publicity photographs with director Gareth Edwards on the set of the Legendary/Warner Bros Godzilla reboot, suggesting a cameo of sorts in the new movie. His scenes were filmed, but ultimately cut from the movie. He is still listed in the movie credits.

Filmography

Selected works

Television

Television drama
Shiratori Reiko de Gozaimasu! (1993) (Shōtarō Hakuchō)
Tokugawa Yoshinobu (1998) (Takatsukasa Masamichi)
Watashi no Aozora (2000) (Jōji Murai)
Shōtoku Taishi (2001) (Mononobe no Moriya)
Rokkā no Hanako-san (2002) (Kaichō Tatsumi)
Saka no Ue no Kumo (2009) (Fujino Susumu)
Carnation (2011) (Seizaburō Matsuzaka)
Keisei Saimin no Otoko Part 3 (2015) (Ikeda Shigeaki)

Dubbing roles

Live action
The Ambushers (Matt Helm)
Cats (Gus "Asparagus" the Theatre Cat (Ian McKellen))
Doctor Dolittle (Doctor Dolittle)
Murderers' Row (Matt Helm)

Animation
Aladdin (1992) (Jafar)
The Return of Jafar
Disney's House of Mouse (Ratigan, Jafar)
Disney's The Great Mouse Detective (Ratigan)
Star Wars Rebels Season 3 (Bendu)

Video games
 Adventure of Tokyo Disney Sea ~Losing of Jewel's Secret (Jafar)
Kingdom Hearts (2002) (Jafar)
Kingdom Hearts II (2005) (Jafar)
Kingdom Hearts Re:coded (2010) (Jafar)

Stage productions
My Fair Lady
South Pacific

Other
Tokyo Disneyland attraction: Country Bear Jamboree (Henry)

References

Bibliography

External links

 

1934 births
2022 deaths
20th-century Japanese male actors
21st-century Japanese male actors
Japanese male voice actors
Japanese stage actors